The positions of majority leader and minority leader are held by two United States senators and members of the party leadership of the United States Senate. They serve as the chief spokespersons for their respective political parties holding the majority and the minority in the United States Senate. They are each elected as majority leader and minority leader by the senators of their party caucuses: the Senate Democratic Caucus and the Senate Republican Conference.

By Senate precedent, the presiding officer gives the majority leader priority in obtaining recognition to speak on the floor of the Senate. The majority leader serves as the chief representative of their party in the Senate, and is considered the most powerful member of the Senate. They also serve as the chief representative of their party in the entire Congress if the House of Representatives, and thus the office of the speaker of the House, is controlled by the opposition party. The Senate's executive and legislative business is also managed and scheduled by the majority leader.                                                       

The assistant majority leader and assistant minority leader of the United States Senate, commonly called whips, are the second-ranking members of each party's leadership. The main function of the majority and minority whips is to gather votes of their respective parties on major issues. As the second-ranking members of Senate leadership, if there is no floor leader present, the whip may become acting floor leader.

Current floor leaders
The Senate is currently composed of 49 Republicans, 48 Democrats, and 3 independents; all the independents caucus with the Democrats.

The current leaders are Senators Chuck Schumer (D) of New York and Mitch McConnell (R) of Kentucky. The current assistant leaders, or whips, are Senators Dick Durbin (D) of Illinois and John Thune (R) of South Dakota.

History
By at least 1850, parties in each chamber of Congress began naming chairs, and while conference and caucus chairs carried very little authority, the Senate party floor leader positions arose from the position of conference chair. Senate Democrats began the practice of electing their floor leaders in 1920 while they were in the minority. John W. Kern was a Democratic senator from Indiana. While the title was not official, the Senate website identifies Kern as the first Senate party leader, serving in that capacity from 1913 through 1917 (and in turn, the first Senate Democratic leader), while serving concurrently as chairman of the Senate Democratic Caucus. In 1925, the Republicans (who were in the majority at the time) also adopted this language when Charles Curtis became the first (official) majority leader, although his immediate predecessor Henry Cabot Lodge is considered the first (unofficial) Senate majority leader.

The United States Constitution designates the Vice President of the United States as president of the Senate. The Constitution also calls for a president pro tempore, to serve as the presiding officer when the president of the Senate (the vice president) is absent. In practice, neither the vice president nor the president pro tempore—customarily the most senior (longest-serving) senator in the majority party—actually presides over the Senate on a daily basis; that task is given to junior Senators of the majority party. Since the vice president may be of a different party from the majority and is not a Senate member subject to discipline, the rules of procedure of the Senate give the Vice President no power beyond the presiding role. For these reasons, it is the majority leader who, in practice, manages the Senate. This is in contrast to the House of Representatives, where the elected speaker of the House has a great deal of discretionary power and generally presides over votes on legislative bills.

List of party leaders
The Democratic Party first selected a leader in 1920. The Republican Party first formally designated a leader in 1925.

See also

 Party leaders of the United States House of Representatives
 President pro tempore of the United States Senate
 Vice President of the United States (President of the United States Senate)
 Party divisions of United States Congresses
 List of political parties in the United States

Notes

References

External links
 Majority and Minority Leaders and Party Whips, via Senate.gov
 Senate Republicans
 Senate Democrats

Party
Party leaders
United States Senate
United States Senate
Lists related to the United States Senate